Maripol (b. 1955) is an artist, film producer, fashion designer and stylist. She has had an influence on the looks of influential artists such as Madonna and Grace Jones. As part of the 1980s New York downtown scene, she captured the likes of Jean-Michel Basquiat, Keith Haring, Andy Warhol, and Debbie Harry with her Polaroid camera. Maripol also produced films, most notably Downtown 81.

Life and career 
Maripol was born in Rabat, Morocco. She was a student of the École des Beaux-Arts in Nantes, France. She was brought up in France, moving to New York City at the age of 19 in 1976 with her then-boyfriend Edo Bertoglio. Within a year, she was working as a designer at Italian fashion label Fiorucci, where she would soon become art director. 

Maripol took her first Polaroid with an SX-70 camera in 1977. She photographed the characters frequenting Studio 54, including Andy Warhol, Steve Rubell, Bianca Jagger, Jerry Hall, and Grace Jones. Her photographs of the Mudd Club have been exhibited at the Rizzoli and Earl McGrath galleries in Manhattan and published in V magazine.

In 1979, Maripol met Jean-Michel Basquiat, then a graffiti artist under the pseudonym SAMO, and the two would soon become close acquaintances. She was the art director for Downtown 81, a film starring Basquiat and featuring Blondie lead singer Deborah Harry and with musical interludes by many New York No Wave bands. The film was directed by her then-partner Edo Bertoglio and written and produced by Glenn O'Brien. It was filmed in 1980-81 as New York Beat, but it wasn't released until 2000 as Downtown 81. Executive producer Michael Zilkha enlisted Maripol to work on post-production of the film, which premiered at the Director's Fortnight in Cannes. 

Maripol met pop singer Madonna in 1982. She styled her looks for the albums Madonna (1983) and Like a Virgin (1984), including the music videos "Burning Up" (1983), "Like a Virgin" (1984), and "Dress You Up" (1985). Madonna's trademark black rubber bracelets, jewellery and crucifixes became an iconic fashion trend of the 1980s. Maripol also made a line of official Madonna jewelry and accessories for the 1985 Virgin Tour. By the mid-80s, Maripol had achieved some success with her own shop, Maripolitan, in the NoHo area of New York.

The deaths of Maripol's friends Warhol, in 1987, and Basquiat in 1988 affected her profoundly. Maripol closed her shop Maripolitan and moved to Los Angeles, where she would marry, before returning to New York to raise her son, Lino.

Maripol was the art director on music videos for Cher, D’Angelo, Elton John, and Luther Vandross. She also has art directed films by Marcus Nispel and Abel Ferrara.

In February 2010, Maripol had a collection of jewelry and tee shirts in the Marc by Marc Jacobs stores, inspired by the jewelry she created in the 1980s.

In 2013, Maripol directed The Message, a documentary about Keith Haring, for his retrospective at the Musée d'Art Moderne in Paris.

In 2014, she released the book Maripol: Little Red Riding Hood, a collection her photographs, sketchbooks and inspirational material. She also published the book Maripola X, featuring 200 of her Polaroid photographs and 69 previously unpublished poems, written in both French and English. That year, she released "Love Each other", her first record as singer with the French composer and producer  which followed her collaboration with the French fashion label Each x Other.

Maripol has been published in various publications such as The New York Times Magazine, ELLE, i-D, WWD, InStyle, The Village Voice and Time Out New York.

Exhibitions 
Maripol's photographs have been exhibited at the Rizzoli and Earl McGrath galleries in New York. Her work has also been exhibited at P.S.1 Contemporary Art Center, the Robert Miller Gallery and Deitch Projects in New York, as well as at the Museé Maillol in Paris.

Books

Maripolarama, powerHouse Books, November 2005 
Maripol: Little Red Riding Hood, Damiani, September 2010

References

External links

 Official Maripol website

 Maripol on IMDB

20th-century American jewellers
21st-century American jewellers
French fashion designers
American fashion designers
French women fashion designers
American women fashion designers
1955 births
Living people
Fashion stylists
American jewelry designers
People from Rabat